Oriental poppies may refer to:

 The oriental poppy flower, papaver orientale
 Oriental Poppies (painting), by Georgia O'Keeffe